Polis EVO is a 2015 Malaysian Malay-language buddy cop action comedy film directed by Ghaz Abu Bakar and written by Joel Soh, Kyle Goonting, Anwari Ashraf and Adib Zaini. The film casts includes Shaheizy Sam, Zizan Razak, Nora Danish, Mimi Ernida, Harun Salim Bachik, Wan Hanafi Su, Hushairy Hussein, Pablo Amirul, Yus Murai and Amerul Affendi. The film tells the story of two police officers, Inspector Khai (Shaheizy Sam) and Inspector Sani (Zizan Razak) who have very different personalities but are forced to work together to bring down a drug trafficking operation. The film was released theatrically on September 17, 2015 nationwide.

Polis EVO has won three awards from ten nominated categories during the 28th Malaysian Film Festival. As of 2019, Polis EVO is currently ranked the ninth highest-grossing Malaysian film of all-time.

Sequel to this film, Polis EVO 2 had just completed filming in January 2018. Zizan Razak and Shaheizy Sam will reprise their lead roles and will be joined by Erra Fazira, Hairul Azreen and also Indonesian star, Raline Shah.

Plot 
An old drug trafficker identified as one Adli Hashim (Wan Hanafi Su) is found dead in a back alley in Kuala Terengganu with hidden drug contraband. Inspector Khai (Shaheizy Sam), the best narcotic inspector in Kuala Lumpur has been assigned to investigate the circumstances surrounding it. The case eventually leads towards a cocaine drug trafficking operation somewhere in the state of Terengganu. Although this case is similar to cases handled by Inspector Khai before, he now has to work with Inspector Sani (Zizan Razak); who is more familiar with the intricacies of the state, being his home town. They both have different personalities; Inspector Khai is firm and swift in action, in contrast to Inspector Sani, who is more stoic and prefers to stick to procedures and protocols. Their differences further complicate their mission. Everything changes when the chief criminal, Izrail, begins to involve Inspector Sani's family in the case. Inspector Sani and Khai learn to work together to complete their mission.

Cast 
 Shaheizy Sam as Inspector Khai
 Zizan Razak as Inspector Sani
 Nora Danish as Anis
 Mimi Ernida as Maya Adli
 Harun Salim Bachik as ASP Mokhtar
 Wan Hanafi Su as Adli Hashim
 Hushairy Hussein as Izrail
 Pablo Amirul as Jimbo
 Yus Murai  as Jemang
 Amerul Affendi as Mat Yam
 Eyka Farhana as Yati
 Ungku Hariz as Sargeant Sofian
Supporting Cast
 Ariel Ganu as Rafael
 Kamaliah Mat Dom as Sani's mom
 Fadilah Mansor as Khai's mom
 Adnan Dzulkafli as Inspector Ayob
 Sol Azmie as Inspector Harun
 Tisha Shamsir as Sargeant Rosalinda
 Amily Iswadi Amidin as Language Interpreter
 Nazim Shah as Sudin Skodeng
Special Appearance
 T.S. Jeffry as Siamese Boss
 Yank Kassim as Izrail's thug
 A. Galak as Inspector Khai's Supervisor

Reception

Critical reception 
Kenneth Chaw of The Star rated the movie a 7 out of 10, saying that it "offers big laughs and even bigger action" despite its premise "isn't exactly new". Chaw also lauded the acting of both leads Shaheizy and Zizan, the latter particularly for his "refreshing" performance in a serious role despite being more associated with comedic fares. Haizir Othman of Malaysiakini applauded the storytelling for its honesty and respect for the audience's intelligence.

Box-office 
The film's launch ceremony were held in Hard Rock Cafe, Kuala Lumpur on 3 August 2015. The movie trailer were also released on YouTube on the same date. Subsequently, Polis EVO had its premiere at GSC Pavilion Kuala Lumpur on 3 September 2015. The movie had its theatrical release on 17 September 2015 in 98 cinemas nationwide and also Brunei. After four day of screening, Polis EVO grossed RM2.5 million with total number of screening increased to 101 cinemas. The movies total gross improved to RM8 million after eleven days of release. After three weeks, the total collection continued to soar to RM13 million with cinemas capped at 102 locations. The earnings added another RM2 million after a month, totalling RM15 million. After six weeks, total gross was at RM16 million.

After 60 days in cinema, the total gross reached RM17.8 million, breaking record previously held by 2014's film The Journey (RM16.87 million).

Theme song

The soundtrack for this film is EVO by Joe Flizzow and SonaOne. This song was released on 3 August 2015 at Hard Rock Cafe, Kuala Lumpur.

Sequel
Production for sequel Polis EVO took longer time due to location related issues. Initial plan was to commence shooting prior Ramadhan (around the month of May) 2017. Polis EVO 2 will witness Joel Soh replacing Ghaz Abu Bakar in the director seat and will include Erra Fazira as co-star.

Indonesian actress, Raline Shah will be the female lead replacing Nora Danish in the film. Several clips in social media were uploaded showing her undergoing training exercise with Shaheizy Sam in preparation for the film.

Principal photography for Polis EVO 2 started at end October 2017 at locations in Kuala Lumpur and Kuantan and wrapped in January 2018 with Zizan Razak dan Shaheizy Sam reviving their characters as Police Inspectors, including other stars such as Erra Fazira, Hairul Azreen dan Raline Shah from Indonesia.

References

External links 
 Official website
 
 
 

2015 films
Films about drugs
Malaysian action comedy films
Tayangan Unggul films
Astro Shaw films
Buddy comedy films
2010s buddy cop films
2015 action comedy films